Audit Scotland is an independent public body responsible for auditing most of Scotland's public organisations. These include the Scottish Government, local councils and NHS Scotland.

Auditing role
It audits over 220 organisations, including:
 77 central government bodies (Scottish Government, NDPB's, Police Scotland, Scottish Fire and Rescue Service, Scottish Water and others)
 23 NHS bodies
 32 local councils
 20 further education colleges

History
Audit Scotland was established in 2000. It employees a staff of around 250 people.

Its corporate HQ is on West Port, in Edinburgh's Old Town. The role of Audit Scotland is to provide the Auditor General for Scotland and the Accounts Commission for Scotland with the services they need to carry out their duties. The core work is to carry out:
financial audits to help ensure that public sector bodies adhere to the highest standards of financial management and governance
performance audits to help ensure that these bodies achieve the best possible value for money.

Stephen Boyle is the Auditor General for Scotland and the accountable officer for Audit Scotland. He started his term of office in July 2020.

The work of Audit Scotland is governed by a board which meets around four times a year: the audits are managed by a management team. The Public Audit and Post-legislative Scrutiny Committee of the Scottish Parliament examines Audit Scotland's proposals for the use of resources and expenditure, then reports to the Scottish Parliament.

See also
 Scottish budget

References

External links
 

New Town, Edinburgh
Organisations based in Edinburgh
Public bodies of the Scottish Government
Scotland
Public finance of Scotland
2000 establishments in Scotland
Government agencies established in 2000
Auditing in the United Kingdom
Auditing organizations